Jiru is a Jukunoid language of Nigeria.

References

Jukunoid languages
Languages of Nigeria